Jackie Aprile may refer to:
Jackie Aprile, Sr., character in the TV series The Sopranos, played by Michael Rispoli
Jackie Aprile, Jr., character who is the son of the above in the TV series The Sopranos, played by Jason Cerbone